On 24 October 1975, Icelandic women went on strike for the day to "demonstrate the indispensable work of women for Iceland’s economy and society" and to "protest wage discrepancy and unfair employment practices". It was then publicized domestically as Women's Day Off.
Participants, led by women's organizations, did not go to their paid jobs and did not do any housework or child-rearing for the whole day. Ninety percent of Iceland's female population participated in the strike. Iceland's parliament passed a law guaranteeing equal pay the following year.

History 
Icelandic women who worked outside of the home before 1975 earned less than sixty percent of what men earned.

The United Nations announced that 1975 was going to be International Women's Year. A representative from a women's group called the Redstockings put forward the idea of a strike as one of the events in honor of it. The committee decided to call the strike a "day off" since they thought that this term was more pleasant and would be more effective in engaging the masses. As well, some women could have been fired for going on strike but could not be denied a day off.

Women's organizations spread the word about the Day Off throughout the country. The Day Off event organizers got radio stations, television, and newspapers to run stories about gender-based discrimination and lower wages for women. The event garnered international attention.

Women's Day Off 
On 24 October 1975, Icelandic women did not go to their paid jobs nor did they do any housework or child-rearing at home. Ninety percent of women took part, including women in rural communities. Fish factories were closed since many of the factory workers were women.

During the Day Off, 25,000 out of a population of 220,000 people in Iceland gathered in the centre of Reykjavik, Iceland's capital, for a rally. At the rally, women listened to speakers, sang, and talked to each other about what could be done to achieve gender equality in Iceland. There were many speakers, including a housewife, two members of parliament, a representative of the women's movement, and a female worker. The last speech of the day was by Aðalheiður Bjarnfreðsdóttir, who "represented Sókn, the trade union for the lowest-paid women in Iceland".

Employers prepared for the day without women by buying sweets, pencils, and paper to entertain the children who would be brought into work by their fathers. As a result, sausages, a popular meal, sold out in many stores that day.

Aftermath 
The Day Off had a lasting impact and became known colloquially as "the long Friday".

Iceland's parliament passed a law guaranteeing equal pay the following year. The strike also paved the way for the election of Vigdís Finnbogadóttir, the first democratically elected female president in the world five years later in 1980.

Every ten years on the anniversary of the Day Off, women stop work early. In 1975, the women strikers left work at 2:05 p.m., and in 2005 they left at 2:08 p.m., reflecting the amount of progress made in 30 years. Increasing the frequency of strikes, in 2010 they left work at 2:25 p.m. and in 2016 at 2:38 p.m., with many women taking part in the Viking Clap outside the Althing.

Legacy 
The 2016 Black Monday in Poland was modelled on the 1975 Icelandic strike.

The International Women's Strike, a global version inspired by the Icelandic strike, spread in 2017 and 2018.

See also
Women in Iceland

References

External links
 Associated Press video of the strike

1975 in Iceland
1975 in women's history
1975 labor disputes and strikes
Feminism in Iceland
Feminist protests
General strikes in Europe
History of women in Iceland
October 1975 events in Europe
Protests in Iceland
Women's protests
Women's rights in Iceland